Świeszyno is a village in Koszalin County, West Pomeranian Voivodeship, in north-western Poland. It is the seat of the gmina (administrative district) called Gmina Świeszyno.

The village has a population of 497.

Notable residents
 Ernst Pöppel (born 1940), German psychologist and neuroscientist

References

Villages in Koszalin County